Pinard may refer to:

 Pinard horn, a type of pregnancy stethoscope invented by Adolphe Pinard
 Pinard (wine), a French term for red wine, associated with World War I

People
 Adolphe Pinard (1844–1934), obstetrician
 Claude Pinard (born 1949), Canadian politician
 Joseph Albert Pinard (1878–1964), Canadian politician
 Roch Pinard (1910–1974), Canadian politician
 Yvon Pinard (born 1940), Canadian judge and politician
 Lancelot Pinard (1902–2001), calypso singer known as Sir Lancelot 
 Pascal Pinard (born 1965), French swimmer

See also
 Ciel, mon Pinard!, a Quebec cookery program with Daniel Pinard
 Pienaar, a surname